Propliopithecoidea is a superfamily of catarrhine primates that inhabited Africa and Arabia during the Early Oligocene about 32 to 29 million years ago. Fossils have been found in Egypt, Oman and Angola. They are one of the earliest known families of catarrhines.

They have a number of features in common with extant catarrhines, but also a number of features that are primitive and not found in later catarrhine families.

There are five species, which are close enough that they can be viewed as a single genus. They have a body mass of 4–6 kg (6–8 kg for zeuxis), similar in size to modern Howler monkeys.

Species 
Propliopithecus ankelae
Propliopithecus chirobates
Propliopithecus haeckeli
Propliopithecus markgrafi aka Moeripithecus markgrafi
Taqah Propliopithecid
Propliopithecus zeuxis aka Aegyptopithecus zeuxis

Classification controversy 
Szalay & Delson (1979), Andrews (1985), Harrison (1987) and Begun (2012) argue that the high degree of similarity means they should be placed in a single genus. Herbert Thomas (1991), following examination of new material in Oman, argues for Moeripithecus markgrafi, citing 'striking differences in morphology' compared to Propliopithecus haeckeli. (Seiffert (2006) suggests that the fossils examined by Thomas might be better classified as "Propliopithecus ankeli"). Seiffert et al. (2010) argue for three genera - Aegyptopithecus, Moeripithecus and Propliopithecus The Taqah Propliopithecid appears more basal, and as such not be part of a Propliopithecus sensu stricto clade.

References 

Prehistoric primates
Catarrhini
Mammal superfamilies